Mohnish Bahl (born 14 August 1961) is an Indian actor working in the Indian film industry and on Indian television.

Career
Mohnish Bahl debuted with the film Bekarar in a supporting role opposite Padmini Kolhapure and co Starring Sanjay Dutt but the film was a critical and commercial failure. His subsequent release was Teri Bahon Mein, a remake of The Blue Lagoon with Ayesha Dutt wife of Jackie Shroff, which was also a failure. His only commercial success in a leading role was Purana Mandir though it was considered a B grade film. The 1999 film Hum Saath-Saath Hain is considered the film that transformed Bahl's career. He has starred in over 100 films, and has been nominated for two Filmfare Awards.

Early life and family
Bahl was born in Mumbai, Maharashtra, India. He is the son of actress Nutan and Lt. Cdr. Rajnish Bahl, and is a prominent member of the Mukherjee-Samarth family. He is married to Aarti Bahl (Known As Ekta Sohini) and they have two children: Pranutan Bahl and Krishaa Bahl

Filmography

Films
{| class="wikitable"
! Year !! Title !! Character !! Notes and references
|-
| 1983
| Bekaraar
| Pradeep
| Debut Film
|-
| rowspan="3"|1984
| Teri Baahon Mein
| Manu
|
|-
| Meri Adalat
| Umesh
|
|-
| Purana Mandir
| Sanjay
|
|-
| 1987
| Itihaas
| Rakesh
|
|-
| 1989
| Maine Pyar Kiya
| Jeevan
|
|-
| 1990
| Baaghi
| Jaggu 
|
|-
| rowspan="2"|1991
| Henna
| Captain Surendra
|
|-
| Dancer
| Manish
|
|-
| rowspan="4"|1992
|Abhi Abhi
|Helmet,College Student/Goon
|
|-
| Bol Radha Bol
| Bhanu 
|
|-
| Deewana
| Narendra 
| Cameo appearance
|-
| Shola Aur Shabnam
| Bali
|
|-
| rowspan="4"|1993
| Phool Aur Angaar
| Inspector Arjun Singh
|
|-
|Ek Hi Raasta
| Vikram Singh
|
|-
| Platform
| Hariya
|
|-
| Aashik Awara
| Vikram
|
|-
| rowspan="5"|1994
| Laadla
| Vicky Bajaj
|
|-
| Eena Meena Deeka
| Mangal
|
|-
| Elaan
| Inspector Vijay Sharma
|
|-
| Prem Yog
| Jimmy Narang
|
|-
| Hum Aapke Hain Koun..!
| Rajesh 
| Nominated—Filmfare Award for Best Supporting Actor
|-
| rowspan="3"|1995
| Kartavya
| Balveer Singh
|
|-
| Sabse Bada Khiladi
| Amit Singh
|
|-
| Gundaraj
| Deva
|
|-
| rowspan="3"|1996
| Raja Hindustani
| Jay Mitra
|
|-
| Army
| Kabir Dubey
|
|-
| Ajay
| Roopesh Singh
|
|-
| rowspan="5"|1997
| Itihaas
| Inspector Pandey
|
|-
| Kaun Sachcha Kaun Jhootha
| Mohandas Khanna
|
|-
| Koyla
| Ashok
| Cameo appearance
|-
| Raja Ki Aayegi Baraat
| Ramesh
|
|-
| Udaan
| Inspector Manoj Sharma
|
|-
| rowspan="7"|1998
|Mohabbat Aur Jung
|Bobby
|
|-
| Duplicate
| Ravi Lamba
|
|-
| Dulhe Raja
| Rahul Sinha
|
|-
| Aunty No. 1
| Gaurav
|
|-
| Phool Bane Patthar
| Baliya Singh
|
|-
| Doli Saja Ke Rakhna
| Vicky
|
|-
| Pardesi Babu
| Naren
|
|-
| rowspan="6" |1999
| Teri Mohabbat Ke Naam
|Balwant
|
|-
| Sirf Tum
| Ranjeet
|
|-
| Vaastav
| Vijaykanth Shivalkar
|
|-
| Hum Saath-Saath Hain
| Vivek Chaturvedi
| Nominated—Filmfare Award for Best Supporting Actor
|-
| Jaanwar
| Aditya Oberoi
|
|-
|Jaalsaaz
|Sukhdev
|
|-
| rowspan="3"|2000
| Kaho Naa... Pyaar Hai
| Inspector Dilip Kadam
|
|-
| Astitva
| Malhaar Kamat
| Bilingual film (Hindi and Marathi)
|-
| Kahin Pyaar Na Ho Jaye
| Vinod Jaisingh
|
|-
| rowspan="2"|2001
| Ek Rishtaa: The Bond of Love
| Rajesh Purohit
|
|-
| Kyo Kii
| Rajat Diwan
|
|-
| 2002
| Haan Maine Bhi Pyaar Kiya
| Rohit Kashyap
|
|-
| 2003 
| LOC: Kargil
| Ramakrishnan Vishwanathan
|
|-
|2005
|Vaah! Life Ho Toh Aisi!
|
|
|-
|rowspan="2"|2006
|Shaadi Karke Phas Gaya Yaar
|Karan / Police Constable Harvinder Singh Harvi
|-
| Vivah
| Dr. Rashid Khan
|
|-
|2007
| Life Mein Kabhie Kabhiee
| Sanjiv Arora (Rajiv's elder brother)
|-
| rowspan="2"|2010
| Chance Pe Dance
| Rajeev Sharama
|
|-
| Isi Life Mein...!
| Ravimohan
|
|-
| rowspan="2" |2011
| Force
| Atul Kalsekar
|
|-
|Desi Boyz
|Vikrant Mehra
|
|-
|2013
|Krrish 3
|Kaal’s Father
|
|-
|2014
|Jai Ho
|Ashok Pradhan
|
|-
|2019
|Panipat
|Balaji Baji Rao
|
|}

Television

Awards and nominations
 1995: Nominated, Filmfare Award for Best Supporting Actor for Hum Aapke Hain Koun..! 2000: Nominated, Filmfare Award for Best Supporting Actor for Hum Saath-Saath Hain: We Stand United 2002: Indian Television Academy Award for Best Actor for Sanjivani – A Medical Boon on Star Plus
 2002: Indian Telly Award for Best Actor in a Negative Role for Devi on Sony Entertainment Television
 2003: Best Actor Indian Television Academy for Sanjivani – A Medical Boon'' on Star Plus

References

External links

 
 

1961 births
Living people
Indian male film actors
Indian male television actors
Indian television presenters
Male actors in Hindi cinema
Male actors from Mumbai
Actors from Mumbai